Summit Hills is a 908 acre real estate development in Calabar, Cross River State, Nigeria that includes a convention centre, hotel, recreational facilities and golf course with clubhouse, nature reserve, hospital and a variety of residential units.

History

The Hospital was scheduled to be commissioned in March 2015.

General information
Although still in construction phase, the project is expected to be comparable in size to the Canary Wharf Business District in London or the Lower Manhattan district in New York City. The site would include a nature reserve for endangered species of monkeys native to Cross River State along with nature trails.

The new Summit Hills Development Area will be rolled out gradually and executed in four phases. The first phase which is ongoing features the construction of the main road, followed by the CICC and the CICC Hotel. The second stage is the development of the residential area and the hospital. The third phase will see the completion of the golf course, clubhouse, and additional residential areas. The fourth and final stage will be completion of the remaining residential area.
The new Summit Hills development will be self-sufficient in the delivery of power generation via a local power plant situated in the vicinity. The dedicated power plant will provide 24-hr power supply to the new Summit Hills development as well as all visitors and guests at the other facilities within the development.

Sub-Projects
Summit Hills is planned to be a large development area, with the following as constituent projects; Calabar International Convention Center (CICC),  CICC Hotel, a golf course, private residences, a state-of-the-art hospital, a Carnival Village and a monorail.

Golf Course
The golf course, designed by Thomson Perrett & Lobb, is situated on the western side of the main access road.

Hospital
The Hospital which is situated on the south-eastern part of the Summit Hills is a world-class medical center which upon completion have facilities of various specialties including gynaecology, obstetrics, paediatrics, internal medicine, General surgery, orthopedics’ laboratory services, basic neology and basic cardiology with plans to extend to oncology in the near future. The hospital project will cost $40 million dollars (6.4 billion naira) and will be executed as a public private partnership between the cross river state government and UCL HealthCare Services Limited. The Cross River State Government is committing half of the capital funds needed, while the balance of the financial requirement will be sourced by the concessionaire, UCL HealthCare Services Limited .

Monorail
The site will include a monorail using electric powered passenger shuttle trains composed of ten cars and a seventy-eight total seating capacity. The train will shuttle passengers between the CICC and the Tinapa complex allowing access to Studio Tinapa, Tinapa Shopping Center, and the Tinapa waterpark.

References

Populated places in Cross River State